David Schuster may refer to:

 David Shuster (born 1967), American television journalist and talk radio host
 David Michael Schuster (born 1952), American tenor
 David Israel Schuster (born 1935), American chemist